Kettana is one of the villages of Gabès in the South of Tunisia. It is located 18 km south of Gabès, on the main road connecting Gabès and Medenine. Kettana is famous for its mouth-watering and delicious pomegranates.

References

Populated places in Tunisia
Gabès Governorate